The 4th World Orienteering Championships were held in Staré Splavy, Czechoslovakia, 14–16 September 1972.

The championships had four events; individual contests for men and women, and relays for men and women.

Medalists

Results

Women's individual

References 

World Orienteering Championships
1972 in Czechoslovak sport
International sports competitions hosted by Czechoslovakia
September 1972 sports events in Europe
Orienteering in Europe